Slower Than Church Music is the second album by American electronic music group Freescha, released April 29, 2002 on AttackNine Records.

Track listing
 "Mollusk" – 1:30
 "Gole" – 6:10
 "Boogy Foot" – 6:53
 "Cosmo Sees Rain" – 2:28
 "The Loom" – 5:03
 "Wood Working" – 2:12
 "Mothy Hooves" – 1:14
 "Abominable Love" – 4:03
 "Saturday Morning" – 0:36
 "Church Music" – 5:39

External links
 
 

2002 albums